The Târzia  is a right tributary of the river Râșca in Romania. It flows into the Râșca near Orțăști.

References

External links
 Tourist map, Parcul Vânători-Neamț

Rivers of Romania
Rivers of Neamț County